Eupithecia hainanensis is a moth in the family Geometridae. It is found in China (Hainan) and Thailand.

The wingspan is about 18–22 mm. The fore- and hindwings are pale brown.

References

Moths described in 2004
hainanensis
Moths of Asia